AGATA, for advanced gamma tracking array, is a highly segmented High Purity Germanium (HPGe)  detector array. It is a European collaboration project funded by twelve countries in Europe. The project was proposed in 2001 and in 2002 it was signed by the participant countries. AGATA  is capable of high counting event rates and can be coupled  with ancillary detectors, such as magnetic spectrometers, fast-timing detectors  charged particles or neutron detectors.

The AGATA detectors are Ge-detectors that are 36-fold segment with six-fold azimuthal and six-fold longitudinal segmentation.

The detector is 10 cm long and is circular at the rear side with a diameter of 8 cm and hexagonal at the front face. A common inner electrode and 36 segments are read out via individual preamplifiers. The segments can then be considered as separate detectors. 

The parameters for the hexagonal crystals are:

	Maximum cylinder size: 90.0 mm length, 40.00 mm radius.
	Coaxial hole size: 10.0 mm diameter, extension to 13.00 mm from the front face.
	Passivated areas: 1.0 mm at the back of the detector, 0.6 mm around the coaxial hole.
	Encapsulation: 0.8 mm thickness with a 4.0 mm crystal-can distance-
	Cryostat: 1.0 mm thickness with a 2.0 mm capsule-cryostat distance.

By exploiting the spatial information contained in the detector signal we can more accurately localize the γ-ray interaction than is possible by the geometry of the segments. A photoelectron or Compton electron generates electrons and holes which induce image charges of opposite signs on the detector electrodes when a signal is produced. The change of the image charge causes a flow of currents into or out of the electrodes. The induced charge is distributed over several electrodes for the large distance in a multi-segmented detector. For the closer distance an increase and decrease of induced charges of the electrodes continue until the primary charge finally reaches to its destination electrodes and neutralizes the image. To identify the detector sector where the interaction took place we have to observe the net charge on the charge-collecting electrode simply observing the polarity of the induced signal. This allows for distinguishing between interactions at small and large radii.

Digital signal processing electronics

The spatial information of the detector signals are known from digital pulse-shape analysis. The pre-amplified detector signal is digitized with 14-bit resolution with a speed of 100 Ms/s. The pre-amplifier signals are digitized with the analog-to-digital converter (ADC). The γ-ray tracking system required a compact digital signal processing electronics with high computing power. Only five values per interaction is enough for the whole information: energy deposition, its time and three spatial coordinates of the interaction point. Different algorithms have been developed depending on the different detector information.

Pulse-shape analysis

The Ge-detector determines the pulse-shape of the γ-ray which contains the information about the three-dimensional position of each individual interaction within the detector with the released energy in the interactions. The efficiency of the tracking array depends on these data. We must be able to compare the pulse-shapes to the respective shapes produced by charges each point to extract the position of the interaction. This is done experimentally using tightly collimated γ-ray sources with an external collimated detector for the Compton scattered coincidence. The conductivity of the Ge-detector influences the magnitude of the drift velocities and the angle between the electric field vector and the drift velocity. As a result the shape of the signal is directly influence because the Ge crystal is anisotropic with respect to the crystallographic axis direction. To determine the position of the interaction of the γ-ray one needs to consider the shapes of the induced real and mirror signals. The electrodes of the segment in which an interaction takes place are used to measure the real signals while mirror signals are measured on the neighboring segments where no interaction takes place.

Gamma-ray tracking
The high segmentation and the digital read out can be used to measure the mirror charges induced in the neighboring segments.  Using a pulse shape analysis of the signal, the interaction point can be estimated. 

The path of the gamma-rays can be reconstructed using a tracking algorithm. 

Multi Geometry Simulation is one of the most developed packages for the analysis are uses multi step algorithm. As shown in the figure, results from the each stage of the calculation are stored in matrices which are later recalled to generate the pulse shape response which is determined by the charge carriers through the weighted field. The crystal volume is divided into cubic matrices for a given detector. For each position the values of the electrical potential, electric field and weighted field are calculated and the drift velocity matrices are calculated from the electric field matrix.

The simulation of the pulse shape for the any arbitrary detector is shown in the figure 8. For a given detector, the crystal volume is divided into a cubic matrix of lattice sites. Values for the electric potential, electric field and weighting field are calculated at each position. The drift velocity matrices are calculated from the electric field matrix. The detector response for a given interaction site is calculated by tracking the trajectory of the charge carriers through the weighting field as shown in figure 8. The steps which should follow to compute the pulse shape response for a given interaction position in the detector volume are:

	Specify the detector geometry.
	Calculate the electric potential surfaces and electric field lines from the solution of the Poisson equation.
	Implement the charge carrier transport in a semiconductor medium.
	Calculate the trajectories of the charge carriers for arbitrary interaction positions.
	Apply Ramo’s [11] theorem to recover the charge at the contacts.
	Weight the potential and weight the field resolution.

Gamma-ray path reconstruction algorithm

Reconstructing the path of the γ-ray interaction is one of the main problems of the γ-ray tracking. There are several proposed methods for constructing the path of the γ-ray and two of them are dominating: the back tracking algorithm and clusterisation. The tracking performance is quite sensitive depending on the choice of the formula for the figure-of-merit so; different figures-of-merit have investigated in detail. The influence of the initial momentum of the Compton scattering on the reconstruction results are need to be investigated.

AGATA is the most efficient γ-ray tracking array ever developed and position sensitive Ge-detectors are the main concept for this. It is mentionable that the Composite Ge detectors were first developed for the EUROGAM spectrometer and it has been used many standard applications. The Encapsulated Ge detectors were developed for the EUROBALL spectrometer. The Segmented techniques are the latest of their combination and are used in AGATA.

References

External links

 

Detectors